Simone Boldini (born 23 May 1954 in Ghedi) is an Italian professional football coach and a former player.

Career

Player 
He has played 12 seasons (228 games, 5 goals) in the Serie A for Calcio Como, A.C. Milan, Ascoli Calcio 1898, S.S.C. Napoli and Atalanta B.C.

Manager 
In the 2011–12 season, Boldini was appointed as the head coach of the Tritium in the Lega Pro Prima Divisione, but on 29 April 2012 he was sacked.

Honours

Player 
Milan
 Serie A champion: 1978–79.

References

External links
 Simone Boldini coach profile at TuttoCalciatori.net 
 

1954 births
Living people
Italian footballers
Serie A players
Spezia Calcio players
Como 1907 players
A.C. Milan players
Ascoli Calcio 1898 F.C. players
S.S.C. Napoli players
Atalanta B.C. players
Italian football managers
A.C. Monza managers
Carrarese Calcio managers
U.S. Livorno 1915 managers
S.S.D. Pro Sesto managers
Como 1907 managers
FC Lugano managers
A.C. Milan non-playing staff
Association football defenders